Scott Robert Doffek (born July 31, 1968) is an American baseball coach and former infielder, who is the current head baseball coach of the Milwaukee Panthers. He attended college at Waukesha County Technical College, where he played on the school baseball team before embarking on a five-year minor league baseball career in the Los Angeles Dodgers organization. He previously served as an assistant baseball coach at the University of Wisconsin–Milwaukee from 1995 to 2006.

Head coaching record

References

External links

 Milwaukee profile

1968 births
Living people
People from Hartland, Wisconsin
Milwaukee Panthers baseball coaches
Junior college baseball players in the United States
Waukesha County Technical College alumni
Baseball players from Wisconsin
Yakima Bears players
Vero Beach Dodgers players
San Antonio Missions players
Gulf Coast Dodgers players
Baseball coaches from Wisconsin